Aberfeldie is a suburb in Melbourne, Victoria, Australia,  north-west of Melbourne's Central Business District, located within the City of Moonee Valley local government area.

Aberfeldie is bounded in the west by Afton Street, in the north by Buckley Street, in the east by Waverley Street and the edge of Aberfeldie Park, and in the south by the Maribyrnong River.

History

Scotsman James Robertson named his property Aberfeldie, located on the corner of Aberfeldie Street and Park Crescent, after the town Aberfeldy in Scotland. When the property was sold in 1888 it became the name of the suburb.

The Polish Catholic church on the corner of Alma Street and Aberfeldie Street was consecrated in 1973 by Cardinal Karol Wojtyla, who later became Pope John Paul II.

Today

The area has tended to attract families, with its abundance of parks, sporting facilities and the Maribyrnong River. There is a range of detached housing from inter-war California bungalows to post-war dwellings.

Sport

Community groups have been active in the suburb since the start of the 20th century. Aberfeldie Bowls Club was established on 16 March 1910. In 1928 the Aberfeldie Progress Association joined with 6 other progress associations to form the Northern Districts Progress Cricket Association. In 1944 the Aberfeldie Community Centre was established promoting football, cricket, tennis, lawn bowls, gymnastics, swimming and basketball, as well as other social and cultural events.

This led to the formation of the Aberfeldie Sports Club (formed in 1974; incorporated in 1987) a family oriented club that began as a community-based sporting organisation in 1948 and today is the home of local grass-roots Australian Rules Football and cricket. It first entered a football team in the 1951 season. Aberfeldie Football Club is now part of the Essendon District Football League and the Aberfeldie Cricket Club is under the jurisdiction of the Victorian Turf Cricket Association and the North West Cricket Association.

Even with three senior football teams and four senior cricket teams, it must be acknowledged that the club's biggest future strength lies with the many junior football players where the club fields 15 junior teams that comprise well over 350 children each year. The club's large junior base continually helps solidify them as one of the area's strongest local clubs. The club enjoys a large supporter and sponsorship base which is controlled by the Aberfeldie Sports Club. The Sports Club oversees the sub-committees running Senior and Junior Football as well as Senior and Junior Cricket and whose main roles are in respect of fundraising for the club.

Educational facilities

Aberfeldie has one government primary school (Aberfeldie PS) and two Catholic primary schools (Our Lady of Nativity PS and Resurrection School), and one Catholic secondary school (Ave Maria College).

Transport

The suburb is serviced by the following bus routes operating around the area:
465 Essendon – Keilor Park via Buckley Street, Milleara SC, Keilor East (every day). Operated by Ryan Brothers Bus Service, along Buckley Street.
467 Moonee Ponds – Aberfeldie (every day). Operated by Ryan Brothers Bus Service, on the corner of Tilba Street and Brunel Street.
468 Highpoint SC – Essendon via Waverley Street (Monday to Saturday). Operated by Ryan Brothers Bus Service, along Buckley and Waverley Streets
903 Altona – Mordialloc SC via Essendon, Northland SC, Box Hill, Chadstone SC (every day). Operated by Kinetic Melbourne, along Buckley Street.

See also
 City of Essendon – Aberfeldie was previously within this former local government area.

References

External links
Aberfeldie Sports Club
REIV Aberfeldie Market Insights, Auction & Private Sale Results

Suburbs of Melbourne
Suburbs of the City of Moonee Valley